The Hanley Economic Building Society is a UK building society, which has its head office in Hanley, Stoke on Trent, Staffordshire. It is the 26th largest in the United Kingdom based on total assets of £426 million as at 31 August 2018. It is a member of the Building Societies Association.

Founded in 1854, the original name of the society was The Staffordshire Potteries Economic Permanent Benefit Building Society. It was in 1930 when the name was shortened to Hanley Economic Building Society.

External links
Hanley Economic Building Society

References

Building societies of England
Banks established in 1854
Organizations established in 1854
Companies based in Stoke-on-Trent
Organisations based in Staffordshire
1854 establishments in England